This is a list of Star Wars humanoid alien sentient species, containing the names of fictional species from the Star Wars franchise beginning with the letters F through J. For Star Wars humans, see Star Wars humans. Star Wars is an American epic space opera film series created by George Lucas. The first film in the series, Star Wars, was released on May 25, 1977, and became a worldwide pop culture phenomenon, followed by five sequels and three prequels. Many species of alien creatures (often humanoid) are depicted.

Falleen
The Falleen are a fictional race of human-like reptilian people who come from a world called Falleen in the Midrim region in the Star Wars universe. They change the color and hue of their skin to convey their emotional states and can also affect the emotional state of others. Males and females of the race have strong pheromones which can easily attract women and men respectively of many humanoid species. The Falleen seldom leave their world due to the belief that their species is superior to all others. A notable Legends villain from this race is Prince Xizor. Another major villain was Darth Karrid of the Old Republic.

Far-Outsiders
Far-Outsiders is the cryptic code-name given by the Chiss who inhabit the edges of the galaxy (an example of one being Grand Admiral Thrawn of the Empire), for the extra-galactic alien force that began assaulting the Unknown Regions in the years during the Galactic Civil War. They are probably the Yuuzhan Vong, who launched a siege on the galaxy from 25-30 ABY (After the Battle of Yavin). The name "Far-Outsiders" is also used by the inhabitants of Zonama Sekot to describe the invaders that attacked their planet. The Far-Outsiders are referred to in the singular, but the Chiss named "Stent" once told Mara Jade that there were "a hundred different threats out there that would freeze your blood if you knew about them. The Ruling Families can't stop them; neither can any power in the region.", suggesting that the term "Far-Outsiders" may apply to any unknown hostile race originating from outside the galaxy.

Feeorin
Nym, a pirate from various Star Wars computer games (including the MMORPG "Star Wars Galaxies") was a Feeorin. It is said that Feeorins only grow stronger with age. Their homeworld was Odryn for a period of time in the Old Republic era, when the oldest and strongest Feeorin was chosen as their leader. The controversial Jedi master Feln was a Feeorin leader. It has been stated in several Star Wars novels and comics that there are only roughly one million Feeorins left in the galaxy, suggesting a decline from a larger number.

Ferroans
Not a well-known species, the only reference is in Force Heretic 1–3 and Rogue Planet. They have icy blue skin, white-toned hair, and live on Zonama Sekot, a living planet. The planet provides them fleshy habitats constructed of its own mass.

Firrerreo
The Firrerreo are a species of near-humans from the planet Firrerre. They have two-toned hair and golden skin. In their culture, if someone says a Firrerreo's name, the Firrerreo would be forced to serve the speaker, as saying a Firrerreo's name was a form of power.

They no longer live on Firrerre; after the poisoning of their world by the Empire, they were loaded onto massive colony ships for a journey to another world. One of their own, a Force-sensitive named Hethrir, betrayed his people by the command of Darth Vader. After the deaths of Darth Vader and Palpatine, Hethrir returned and intercepted the colony ships. He disengaged the drives and left the sleeping Firrerre to drift in space. He plundered the ships for the valuable equipment on board and took the children to sell as slaves. Hethrir kidnapped the children of Han Solo and Princess Leia Organa Solo; Anakin and the twins Jacen and Jaina. Han was on a mission on the time and did not know of the kidnappings, so Princess Leia set out to find them herself. On her quest she stumbled upon the drifting colony ships. She asked one of the two awake Firrerre if he wanted to be freed, but he said that they would reengage the drive, heading towards the planet selected for them by the Emperor years before. They were considered extinct by the Yuuzhan Vong War, but, 15 years later, they were just considered scattered.

Fosh
The Fosh are a sentient avian species. They are first mentioned in the Star Wars: The New Jedi Order series. The only Fosh mentioned in all the Star Wars books was the Jedi Knight Vergere.

The Fosh never had a large population on their planet, which prevented them from becoming an influential race as humans are in the Star Wars universe.

Fosh females have preternaturally developed tear ducts, used for mating purposes on their homeworld.  The Jedi Vergere, with the aid of the Force, can further alter her tears to secrete anything from an extremely potent anesthetic, to a powerful antidote such as the one that cured Mara Jade Skywalker after she was infected with a deadly Yuuzhan Vong disease.

The only known Fosh, a female Jedi Knight named Vergere is also mentioned during Anakin Skywalker's time on Zonoma Sekot, as he recalls a flashback of her. Her call is what brought Obi-Wan and Anakin to the planet in the first place, although they can find no trace of her, and instead hear of mysterious invaders. The description of Vergere falls in line with the description of her when she returns with the Yuuzhan Vong, and is the same Vergere that disappeared from Zonoma Sekot.

Frozian
The Frozian are a species of sentient felines, hailing from the planet Froz. Their most distinctive characteristics are their triple-jointed hands, their double-jointed legs, and their infertility off their homeworld.

Following the decimation of their planet by the Empire, the species started plummeting towards extinction. It has been rumored that underground scientists have been trying to create an artificial environment for them to save their species and allow mating to begin again.

Frozarns
Frozarns are pink humanoids with green eyes and tough armor. They live on Mimban.

Gado
Gados are tall, thin, furry sapients with long limbs and a worm-like head. Most of a Gado's inner organs are stretched out in ribbons that run throughout their body; thus, any injury can be life-threatening to a Gado. Gados are native to the planet of Abregado-rae. They formerly spoke a language called Gados, but now mostly speak Basic.

Gamorrean
A Gamorrean is a large pig-like humanoid from the fictional Star Wars series. The creatures have little intelligence and are often hired as guards, notably by Jabba the Hutt, who was fond of hiring them due to their low cost. On their home planet, Gamorreans exist in a sort of tribal political system dominated by the female sows. The males train for massive tribal conflicts that take place each year. The first time a space ship landed on Gamorr, the various tribes fought for days over who would win the right to approach it. The winning side eventually battered the vessel to pieces. Entries regarding the Gamorrean homeworld in travel guides simply read "DO NOT GO TO GAMORR!"

Physically, Gamorreans appear in Return of the Jedi as greenish, slimy (and apparently smelly) pig-like creatures. Underneath their pig-like snouts, protruding from jowled cheeks are yellowed tusks. These complement the small, yellow horns the Gamorreans have growing from the top of their heads. These creatures appear in a picture released by the author of the show The Mandalorian, Jon Favreau, to show the release of season 2 of the show coming out in fall of 2020. A few Gammoreans also feature prominently in The Book of Boba Fett.

Howard Stern has referred frequently to "Gamorrean Guard", a person interviewed by Gary Garver at a Star Wars convention.

Gand
Gands are insectoids who evolved on the planet Gand. There are two main sub-species of Gands: those with lungs, which are very rare, and those without. Gands with lungs are adapted to Gand's ammonia-rich atmosphere, but they are poisoned by oxygen and must use a special breathing apparatus if they want to leave Gand. Gands without lungs have special regeneration properties, demonstrated by their ability to recover quickly from injuries and even re-grow lost limbs (As shown by Ooryl Qrygg in the X-wing series by Michael Stackpole).

Gands are not allowed to use personal pronouns unless they have achieved something extraordinary. A young or under achieving Gand talks about himself or herself in third person and calls themselves "Gand". If a Gand achieves something notable, they can use their family's surname, but will still use the third person. A second, more impressive feat allows the heroic Gand to choose a first name for himself. Only the best-known Gands are allowed to use the first person, and then only after their aptitude has been audited by a jury, in what is called a janwuine-jika, after which they are declared janwuine. However, should a Gand be ashamed of their deeds, they would "reduce" their name when talking about themselves.

Many Gands choose a strange profession, the Findsman. A Findsman is a shaman as well as a police officer. The Findsman will interpret the shapes of gases and make prophecies, usually about fugitives. Then, the Findsman will track the fugitive to bring him to justice. During the reign of the Empire, some Findsmen became bounty hunters.

One of the best-known Gands is Zuckuss, who was a bounty hunter employed by Darth Vader to hunt down Han Solo, and was at one time the assistant to Bossk. Another well known Gand is Ooryl Qrygg, a pilot in Rogue Squadron, and a very good friend of Corran Horn, both of whom are characters in the book I, Jedi. Ooryl lacked lungs and therefore did not need a mask for normal oxygen environments. He became so honored among Gands that he was given the honor of referring to himself in the first person. It is apparent, based on Corran's observations, that if Ooryl was troubled or distressed he would speak in third person until the problem was solved. An example of such would be when Corran and Ooryl were in the mess hall on a Mon Calamari cruiser: Ooryl, in mid-conversation, began speaking in third person, and Corran immediately noticed something was troubling him, with the author (who narrates from Corran's point of view) noting that Ooryl only did this when something was bothering him.

Gank
Also known as "Gank Killers" due to their volatile nature, Ganks are a sentient cyborg species. It is a rare day that you see a Gank not wearing his body-covering armor. Many are found working for Hutts on Nar Shaddaa, but there are other Ganks living in other places besides "The Smuggler's Moon". It is also quite common for Ganks to wear armor that represents the planet they live on or the faction they fight for. They are brutal killers that will annihilate anything that gets in their way. There is a story, however, of an encounter a group of Ganks had with the Jedi Master Mace Windu. Surrounded by 14 Ganks, Master Windu simply touched his lightsaber hilt and the Ganks dropped their weapons to the ground.

Gen'Dai
These large humanoids are encased in heavy armor most of the time, which serves as their exoskeleton. Their nervous and circulatory systems make them extremely resilient. Their nervous system is composed of thousands of clusters allowing them to regenerate limbs and pull nearby limbs back onto their bodies. This unusual nervous system gives them Jedi-like reflexes. They also lack a central heart. They have an advanced vascular system that circulates blood. They lack vital organs making them nearly invulnerable to attack. These odd nervous and circulatory systems may be the cause of their astonishingly long lifespans. There were some Gen'Dai reported to have lived for more than 4,000 years.

The most well known Gen'Dai was Durge. He was one of Count Dooku's lieutenants and also one of the rare cases of "violent Gen'Dai". Durge fought and bested a young Boba Fett in combat but was later beaten on Muunilinst by Obi-Wan Kenobi, before being killed in space by Anakin Skywalker, near the end of the Clone Wars (Anakin trapped Durge in an escape pod then used the Force to guide it into a nearby star).

Gerb
Gerbs are a race of hunchbacked rabbit-like aliens. They live on the thirteenth moon of Yavin.

Geonosian
The Geonosians are an insectoid species native to the planet Geonosis, a barren rocky world that is home to thousands of factories geared towards mechanical construction. Many of the galaxy's biggest manufacturing concerns hold contracts with the Geonosians. Geonosians reside in hive colonies in organic-looking spires. George Lucas thought of the creatures as termite-like in terms of how their society formed, including their architecture. All Geonosians have a hard exoskeleton, elongated faces, multi-jointed limbs, and speak in a strange clicking language. There are two main types of Geonosian: the wingless drones that mostly work as laborers, and the winged aristocrats, which includes royal warriors serving as scouts and providing security to the hive. They look down on their wingless cousins. In Star Wars: The Clone Wars, it is revealed that the Geonosian Queen Karina the Great uses a kind of "brain worm" to ensure the loyalty of other Geonosians. This mind control exists even after the host's death, although the "Geonosian zombies" have pure white eyes.

Geonosians do not have a standing military, although they do arm themselves with sonic blasters and static pikes. They instead use their droid foundries to build armies for corporate interests wealthy enough to afford them like the Trade Federation and the Techno Union. The Geonosians are also the ones who developed the Death Star plans, leading to the race being mostly enslaved under Imperial occupancy as the Death Star itself was being built. (As seen in "Star Wars: Empire at War") But as revealed in Star Wars Rebels two-part episode "Ghost of Geonosis", the Geonosians were nearly driven to extinction by the Empire to ensure the secrecy of the Death Star as it was nearing completion, and moved to an undisclosed location. Only a Geonosian nicknamed "Klik-Klak" and a queen egg appear to remain on Geonosis.

Poggle the Lesser was a Geonosian who appeared in Episode II and oversaw the production of battle droids for the Trade Federation and later provided the bulk of the troops for the Confederacy of Independent Systems. He was decapitated by Darth Vader on Mustafar in Episode III. In the video game Star Wars Battlefront II, the player must fight a Geonosian who is trying to use the droid factories on Mustafar to create his own army. He was named Gizor Delso.

Geonosians make a unique appearance in Lego Star Wars: The Video Game, appearing with one of two weapons (either their characteristic sonic blaster or a normal blaster rifle) randomly, beyond the player's control.

Givin
The Givin are from the planet Yag'Dhul and are often found doing starship repair work because of their exoskeleton, which allows them to withstand depressurization; this vacuum-resistance allows them to resist many forms of deadly gases. Givin are renowned for their extensive knowledge of anything that has to do with numbers, and often are regarded as some of the best mathematicians in the galaxy.

Gizka
Gizka are a species of small amphibious creatures, appearing in the video game Star Wars: Knights of the Old Republic. Whatever their native world, their extraordinary reproduction rate led to a fair amount of Gizka on many worlds, even including uncharted planets such as Rakata Prime, finding their way from the wreckage of crashed starships. It has been alternatively postulated that they came from that planet originally, spreading along with the Infinite Empire. Their exponential population growth led to them being considered pests on almost as many worlds as they inhabited.

The Ebon Hawk once played host to a temporary colony of Gizka, in an incident involving mishandled cargo, an Aqualish, and a Tatooine shipping company. To get rid of them the Gizka were given poison and when they attacked other Gizka they passed on the disease exterminating the population. (Alternatively, the gizka can be sold or given to a Selkath "petting zoo" on the water planet of Manaan.)

The Gizka are a tribute to the popular Star Trek episode, "The Trouble with Tribbles".

Glymphid
The Glymphid are a race of amphibian aliens with a rod-thin build, suction cup-tipped digits, and a long proboscis. Notable Glymphids include the podracer Aldar Beedo.

Gorax
The Goraxes are a race of behemoths from the forest moon of Endor. They can grow up to more than 98 feet in height and dwell on high crags far from the forests of the forest moon. They are mentioned in the Illustrated Star Wars Universe book and one appears as an antagonist in the Caravan of Courage: An Ewok Adventure movie. They are humanoid, with primate-like faces and narrow chins, as well as enormous ears which are highly sensitive to noises made by small animals. They communicate through grumbling noises. The Goraxes wear fur clothes. They are primitive and powerful and frequently make raids on Ewok villages, where they smash through walls and kidnap Ewoks for pets, although the Goraxes usually forget to feed them or crush the unfortunate Ewoks. They hunt at night, since their eyes are sensitive to bright light. The Gorax is solitary and usually doesn't run into others. The only bond it has is with its pet boar wolves.

Gorith
The Gorith are a tall humanoid race with a large beaked head. Their skin tone ranges from blues to greens. Their home planet is Gorithia; a mostly aquatic world. They are very independent from the rest of the universe and are not part of the Galactic Republic. Notable Gorith include Jedi Master Ottarious and his padawan Petirus Metris.

Gorog
The Gorog (or the 'Dark Nest') are one of the eleven hives of the Killik who are an insectoid sentient species from the Unknown Regions. They have the ability to block themselves from the force, similar to the effect of the Ysalamiri of Myrkr and are a black and blue color. The Gorog are considered 'evil' in that they feed their grubs on live captives (mainly Chiss) and have a desire for war and wish to conquer the galaxy. The Gorog are led by the two dark Jedi Welk and Lomi Plo.

Non-Killiks become what are known as Joiners if they spend too long with the Killik. Joiners are regular species who become one with the hive. Raynar Thul became a joiner and then the UnuThul or king of the Killiks. Lomi and Welk joined the Gorog and all of their values were passed to the Dark Nest, corrupting the Gorog. The Dark nest was able to influence UnuThul like the subconscious of a mind, into unwillingly moving into Chiss border zones and provoking a dispute.

The Killik naturally did not care about life much until the Crash. The Crash was when Welk and Lomi Plo crashed on a Killik world, in a ship from Myrkr the Tachyon Flyer with their prisoner Raynar Thul, a Jedi who was involved in the attack on Myrkr. Raynar managed to use the force to make the Killik heal him but in the process, was made mostly insect and The Joiner King. The Killik share a collective mind which allow them to transmit thought between each other. So when Raynar became one of the Hive, The Jedi love of life was passed to all Killiks, causing them to value and try to preserve life.

The Gorog originally were based on the moon Kr on the Chiss border and were destroyed by Mara Jade and Luke Skywalker, Han and Leia Organa Solo, a group of Jedi Masters from the Jedi academy on Ossus and a squad of specially equipped 'Bugcruncher' battle droids. Welk was killed by Luke Skywalker in the Battle of Kr. All of this occurred seven years after the Fall of Coruscant and roughly five years after the Battle of Yuuzhan'Tar. The Dark nest was thought to be destroyed along with the Jedi turned-Gorog Joiner Alema Rar. But the nest and Alema survived and moved to the Tusken's Eye in the Utegetu nebula where the Killiks mostly had peace for one year. During their time in the Utegetu Nebula, the Dark Nest built a fleet of 11 armed hive ships, harbored pirates, killed Supreme Commander Sien Sovv of the Alliance, smuggled dark nest membrosia to insect worlds, framed the Jedi for a problem on the Utegetu worlds and convinced the Killiks and UnuThul to attack the galaxy. All this was done under the command of Lomi Plo and Alema Rar, the night herald.

There are other hives like the main hive Unu and the artistic hive Saras.

Gossam
The Gossam are a humanoid race with long necks from the planet Castell. The Commerce Guild, which was a major contributor to the droid armies of the Confederacy of Independent Systems, is based on Castell. Notable Gossam include Shu Mai, the President of the Commerce Guild.

Gotal
Gotals evolved in dark Antar 4. As light is not available there, they evolved cranial cones, receptors to electromagnetism and other emissions. They do not rely on sight, but they can be great trackers thanks to their cones. However, natural emissions from a droid or a Jedi do damage Gotals. Culturally, they only seem to be attracted to other creatures with cones or horns. This has led to many unfortunate deaths as many male Gotals will be attracted to females of the H'nemethe species who tend to disembowel their mates.

Gran
The Gran (also known as Kinyenians) are a three-eyed alien race, 1.5 to 1.8 meters in height. They are native to the planet Kinyen, though they have colonies across the galaxy, such as on the planets Hok and Malastare. They are characterized by three eyes on stalks, a protruding, goat-like mouth, and orange skin. Gran had a great deal of power within the Galactic Senate, during the later years of the Old Republic. However, by the time the Emperor's reign descended over the galaxy Gran became less prominent, and suffered from Imperial oppression.

A representative of this species is Maks Leem, a Jedi from the Old Republic, who was murdered by Asajj Ventress. Other notable Gran include Plat Mallar and Ree-Yees.

In the series The Clone Wars, two senators, Senator Kharrus and Senator Philo, make one-episode appearances. They are both killed. Kharrus died in a shuttle crash, and Philo was shot in the back by Cad Bane.

In the Expanded Universe, most notably in the video games, Grans have become one of the most prominent enemies the player has to face, which is seen in the Dark Forces/Jedi Knight games.

Gree
The Gree were a six-tentacled race of cephalopod creatures that had an unusual anatomy with gray skin, large sad-looking eyes along with tall foreheads. These features supported an immense brain sac which flopped oddly behind their heads.

Grizmallt
The Grizmallt are the original settlers of Naboo. The Naboo's history begins about 3950 BBY on the planet Grizmallt with the rise of Queen Elsinor den Tasia. To begin her reign, Tasia introduced a new age of exploration and colonization. Under her rule, Grizmallt spent the next several decades launching hundreds of expeditions into the wilds of space. Most of these missions failed, the colony ships destroyed or lost as they searched for habitable worlds far beyond the known hyperlanes.

In the final days of her life, Queen Tasia personally sponsored the last such expedition. With the blessing of a famous Jedi Master, the colony ship Beneficent Tasia and its support starships, Constant and Mother Vima, left Grizmallt in search of fortune and glory. The expedition targeted the galaxy's dangerous southern quadrant, then home to a handful of settlements. On Grizmallt, Queen Tasia's dying wish was that this last expedition would find a home deep within unexplored space. Shortly after she perished, however, the Beneficent Tasia also went silent.

The inhabitants of Grizmallt assumed that Beneficent Tasia had been lost, but the starship did, in fact, survive the many hazards of unknown space. Although severely damaged and unable to contact Grizmallt, the expedition eventually reached Naboo's orbit. As if guided by Tasia's last wish, the settlers discovered that Naboo was a pastoral, peaceful world rich in natural resources and quite capable of supporting human life. In approximately 3900 BBY (Before the Battle of Yavin), the Grizmallt colonists crash landed on Naboo to stay.

Within weeks of their arrival, the settlers encountered the Gungans, the planet's native sentient species. Although immediately distrustful of one another, neither species attacked the other and the humans were allowed to establish their first settlement without incident. Over the next several decades, the settlers slowly spread across the planet's largest landmass, building cities and villages to support their growing numbers. The human colonists kept to the grassy plains and ocean coastlines, only occasionally treading into Gungan territory. Despite this, tension between the humans and the Gungans remained strong.

Gungans named the human settlers as "Naboo" , the Gungan word for "foolish" or "plainsfolk" as the humans settled on the dry grassy northern plains of the planet which the indigenous Gungans considered foolish, being undesirably dry and hostile to their way of life. The amphibious Gungans dwell in the southern wet swamplands, lakes and seas of the planet.

Grysk / Yuuzhan Vong
Initially introduced as the Yuuzhan Vong in the book series The New Jedi Order (1999–2003), the species were an extragalactic, technophobic, fanatically religious species who were intent upon conquering the galaxy, which they attempted during the Yuuzhan Vong War (25–29 ABY). They were both invisible to direct Force sight and unaffected by direct Force powers. The Yuuzhan Vong used biotechnology instead of mechanical technology. Their homeworld was at first in a different galaxy and was called Yuuzhan'tar, which was destroyed in the Cremlevian War. Some went to a seed that was produced from the ashes of Yuuzhan'Tar which was first seen by people in the Unknown Regions and was called Zonama Sekot. Others went to Coruscant, which they renamed Yuuzhan'tar upon conquering the planet in 27 ABY, ending the New Republic.

The Yuuzhan Vong believed that all other races were little more than barbarians who were not fit to live in their presence. Because of this the Vong attempted to conquer the universe with little thought to the damage they were doing to the universe or its inhabitants. The only race the Vong saw as a threat, or as close to a threat as they were willing to believe, were Wookiees. They saw them as fierce warriors and felt that they deserved to live. For this reason, the Vong enslaved Wookiees rather than attempting to destroy them.

After the fall of Coruscant, the scattered New Republic's troops reorganized and joined forces with the Imperial Remnant (established in 12 ABY) to form the Galactic Federation of Free Alliances (or simply Galactic Alliance) in 28 ABY, which managed to defeat the Yuuzhan Vong and drive them back to the Unknown Regions in 29 ABY.

Canon
After the October 2012 acquisition of Lucasfilm by Disney, the Yuuzhan Vong were declared non-canonical in April 2014. In their stead, the film Star Wars: The Force Awakens (2015) introduced the First Order, a faction that arose from one of many Imperial Remnants between 5 and 21 ABY, and eventually destroyed the New Republic in 34 ABY, while the Resistance (formed in 28 ABY) continued to fight against the First Order. A canonical version of the Yuuzhan Vong, now known as the Grysk, were introduced in the Timothy Zahn novel Thrawn: Alliances (2018). Both species are described as having sloping foreheads and skull-like faces, and being a threat to the Chiss Ascendancy hailing from the Unknown Regions and enslaving other races, though the Grysk use conventional mechanical technology rather than biotechnology, as the novel is set in an earlier time frame than the previous non-canonical Legends novels.

Gungan

The Gungans, also known as Goongas, have humanoid amphibious bodies, but their heads are elongated with large, dangling fin-like ears. They are amphibian in blood and seem to have evolved from frogs and toads, given their incredible jumping. They live in underwater cities on the planet Naboo. The principal Gungan character in the movies is Jar Jar Binks; the ruler of the Gungans is Boss Nass. Boss Nass is an Ankura, a subspecies of Gungan. The only other Gungans to be given a name in the films are Captain Tarpals and Augara Jowil, though the novelization also mentions a General Ceel and The Yellow Dart. Other games have shown other leaders including Boss Gallo.

The Gungans and the Naboo (human inhabitants of Naboo) did not get along, as the Gungans believed the Naboo to be pompous cowards, while the Naboo believed the Gungans to be barbarians. This attitude lasted until Queen Amidala united the Gungans and Naboo to fight the Trade Federation in the Battle of Naboo. After the Battle of Naboo, the Gungans attained representation in the Senate through Representative Jar Jar Binks, who became very close friends with Senator Padmé Amidala.

The Gungans reproduce sexually; although they seem androgynous, the males tend to be taller and more muscular than the females, who usually tie their long ears back.

Gwurran
The Gwurran of Ansion look like the native Ansionians, only smaller. They are hyperactive, inquisitive beings who live primitively off the land and who steal the food of travelers passing through the hills. The Gwurran deeply hate their taller rural brethren, the Alwari, who consider them to be backward.

Habassa
The Habassa are mentioned only in the X-Wing video game. They originate from the planet Habassa II which was enslaved by the Empire. After the Battle of Yavin, they joined the Alliance.

Hallotan
The Hallotans are scaly creatures who are native to the planet Muskree. They have turned Muskree into an industrial planet and are immune to the pollutions they have created.

Hapan
The Hapans are the people of the Hapes Cluster and the Hapes Consortium. The Hapes Cluster is very bright, so Hapans' vision at night is not as good as other humans. Though similar to humans, they are known for being beautiful, especially the women. The women are also the dominant sex. Hapans speak the Hapan language.

Harch
The Harch were sentient spider-like species from Secundus Ando. Admiral Trench of the Star Wars: the Clone Wars series is of this race.

Herglic
Herglics were a cetacean-like species similar to whaladons. They originated from Giju.

Himoran
The Himorans share an ancient lineage with Bothans, thus are similar in appearance, though significantly taller. Hailing from the massive planet Himora, these sentients are a primitive people, their homeworld having been long neglected by larger existing governments. Himorans are exceptional in that their population contains an unusually large number of Force-sensitive individuals, expected to number more than 7,000.

H'nemthean
H'nemtheans are reptilian humanoids, from the planet H'nemthe, have four conelets and double cheekbones, resulting in ridges of bone and skin on their faces. The hornlets are sensitive to both emotion and temperature. When a female H'nemthe consummates her relationship with a male, she eviscerates him with her knife-shaped tongue, strangely considering it a proof of love. This odd ritual is most likely a result of the fact that there are 20 males to every female on their home planet.

Hoojib
The Hoojibs are small furry telepathic creatures that are indigenous to Arbra. The Hoojibs allowed the Rebel Alliance to use their planet as a temporary headquarters following the Battle of Hoth. One of the best-known Hoojibs is Plif, who accompanied Luke Skywalker on several missions. Plif later became a New Republic senator.

Huk
The Huk were a race of aliens hailing from the planet of the same name. They are an insectoid species and resemble Geonosians. Their planet was in a constant war with the Kaleesh people of the neighboring planet, Kalee, for many years prior to the Clone Wars and the Great Jedi Purge. The Galactic Republic aided the Huk in their war against the Kaleesh, though this still did not garner enough sympathy for the Separatists to convince General Grievous to join their cause.

Hssiss
Hssiss were large dragon like creatures that appeared on Korriban. Members of this species are shrouded with the dark side and feature large armor plating on the dorsal region. These creatures have a strong connection with the force and an ability to become invisible. In the Xbox game Knights of the Old Republic II: The Sith Lords, they guarded the skeletal remains of what was left of the old Sith Academy. If you choose to search the remains of a Sith, Hssiss would come out of nowhere and attack you. They are formidable and are immune to certain force powers.

Hutt

Hutt are a clan of crime lords that control territory in the outer rim.
Hutts are a long-lived gastropoid species. They originated on Varl, but now claim Nal Hutta as their homeworld. Of them, Jabba the Hutt is perhaps the most famous, appearing in The Phantom Menace, A New Hope, and Return of the Jedi (where he was the first major antagonist.) Ziro the Hutt (who is Jabba's uncle) is probably the second most well-known, as he is prominently featured in Star Wars: The Clone Wars. Gardulla the Hutt is mentioned in The Phantom Menace as the former slave owner of Anakin and Shmi Skywalker before losing a podracing bet to Toydarian junk dealer Watto; she also appears as a member of the Hutt Council in The Clone Wars. Durga the Hutt and Jiliac the Hutt are prominently featured as rival crime lords in The Han Solo Trilogy, and Jabba's father, Zorba the Hutt, is featured prominently in the Jedi Prince series.

Despite evidence of sexual deviance, Hutts are actually asexual, and choose when to give birth, as described in the second Han Solo trilogy and the Clone Wars novel.

Iktotchi
The Iktotchi are an alien race located in a remote system in the Expansion Region, next to the Corellian Run, along with neighboring planet Aridus. They have a tough, hairless, and often reddish skin, as well as two downward-sloping horns on the sides of the head. They are often known for their limited abilities in precognition and, because of this trait, can often be found in Jedi Academies.

When the Republic discovered their home planet, a moon orbiting the planet Iktotchon, they discovered a massive Old Republic seal visible from space with the naked eye.

One famous Iktotchi is Jedi Master Saesee Tiin, who sat on the Jedi Council.

Iktotchi are also known for their skills as pilots. Even the worst Iktotchi pilot is still considered a more than useful being to have behind the controls of a spaceship or fighter.

Ishi Tib
Ishi Tibs are ecologist aliens from planet Tibrin. They are amphibious with huge eyes and beak-like mouths. They have lungs that double as internal gills, and they require immersion in briny water every 30 hours before their skin dries out. Ishi Tib are patient, thoughtful beings who are not prone to rash acts. Nonetheless, they are fiercely dedicated, completing any task they begin. Ishi Tib are ferocious fighters, especially when cornered. Offworld Ishi Tib are known for their devotion to nature, and for their excellent managerial skills.

There are Ishi Tibs in Jabba the Hutt's palace and also in the Rebel briefing to attack the second Death Star.

Ithorian
Ithorians are a species of intelligent herbivores from the planet Ithor. They are commonly called "Hammerheads" because of their long, curving neck and T-shaped head.

Ithorians have two mouths and glossy, brown flesh. In general, they are devoted environmentalists, staunch herbivores, and complete pacifists. Many have become galactic traders who peacefully travel the stars in giant herd ships. They will only resort to violence if threatened. Because of their mild demeanor, most Ithorians avoided the Galactic Civil War, although a few joined the Rebel Alliance.

Ithorians are natives of the planet Ithor, a lush world with sprawling rain forests. The Ithorians worship Mother Jungle and long ago vowed never to desecrate their planet. Once they discovered repulsorlift technology, the Ithorians built expansive "herd cities" floating in the skies above their home world. The species migrated to these platforms, ensuring that Ithor would remain pristine forever. However, the Yuuzhan Vong destroyed their planet when the second in command released a plague that turned everything into a black sludge.

Abroad, Ithorians have integrated well with the intergalactic community. Their own language is difficult for non-Ithorians to learn, as the Ithorians have twin mouths on opposite sides of their necks. However, they are able speak Basic, albeit with an accent. Their vocal cords are strong enough to produce a sound shockwave used in defense to stop an enemy in its tracks.

Ithorian Roron Corobb was a Jedi Master who died protecting Chancellor Palpatine from General Grievous during the Clone Wars.

Momaw Nadon, an exiled Ithorian, was present in the Mos Eisley Cantina in A New Hope.

As seen in Star Wars: Knights of the Old Republic, Ithorians were also instrumental in the restoration of the planet Telos after it was destroyed by Sith during the Jedi Civil War. An Ithorian named Chodo Habat employed the help of a Jedi Exile during the Telos Restoration Project with the promise that he would cure the exile's "wound in the Force" if the Jedi Exile foiled Czerka Corporation's attempts to take over the restoration project.

Jawa

The Jawas are a pygmy rodent-like race inhabiting the desert planet of Tatooine. They work as scavengers and tinkerers, picking up discarded or broken machinery and fixing it up to resell as well as stealing anything that catches their eye. Jawas are usually peaceful unlike Tusken Raiders, but may sometimes use ion blasters or other weapons to defend themselves. They are entirely covered in tan cloaks, with their faces hidden in hoods and only their glowing yellow or red eyes visible. For transport in the desert world, they use long-abandoned mining Sandcrawlers. These lumbering giants can house a family unit as well as store cargo that they have collected on their journeys. Jawas belong to clans. Half of the clan works in the Sandcrawler, while the other half lives in desert fortresses made from wrecked spaceships for protection against Tusken Raiders and krayt dragons. They also serve as a home for the rest of the Jawa clan which stores the wealth gathered by the other family unit in the Sandcrawler. Jawas have a reputation with Tatooine locals for being swindlers and thieves.

Jawas appear briefly in Star Wars: Episode I – The Phantom Menace during the Boonta Eve Classic Podrace, and in Episode II – Attack of the Clones, giving directions to Anakin Skywalker. They also appear in Star Wars: A New Hope when they picked up C-3PO and R2-D2 and sold them to Owen Lars and Luke Skywalker, as well as multiple Jawas appearing among the riffraff in Jabba the Hutt's palace in Star Wars: Return of the Jedi. Two Jawas and a Sandcrawler are seen at the end of The Rise of Skywalker. Jawas also appear on the planet Arvala-7 in "Chapter 2: The Child", the second episode of the television series The Mandalorian, in which they are depicted with red eyes (recalling Ralph McQuarrie's concept art). Though Jawas are based upon Tatooine, some Jawas have left the planet and built up their civilizations elsewhere, such as the tribe on Arvala-7. Because Jawas enjoy scavenging, they tend to build their Sandcrawlers and engage in the same activities on other planets as they do on Tatooine.

Specialists studying the past of the Sand People of the Tusken Raiders also used the term Ghorfa to denote an earlier sedentary phase of their culture, and, lastly Kumumgah, for the earliest stratum of sentient civilization on the planet, believed by some to represent a common ancestry shared by the Tuskens and the Jawas.

Jungle felucian

The Jungle Felucians, more commonly referred to as the Felucians, were an amphibious sentient species native to the planet Felucia. Viewed as strange and unusual by other species, the Felucians possessed two sets of arms—one ending in four webbed digits, and the other in three dexterous fingers—as well as a head consisting of a thick mass of tendrils. Members of the species usually stood 1.9 meters tall and weighed ninety kilograms. The Felucians were naturally sensitive to the Force and were in tune with their home planet's ever-changing balance of that energy field. The Felucians possessed no advanced technology and lived a somewhat primitive lifestyle. Unlike many other primitive species, the Felucians were not divided into multiple tribes; rather, they were all members of a single tribe spanning the entirety of Felucia. However, the species did have strict class stratification. Three of their most prominent classes were the warriors, the shamans, and the chieftains.

See also

 Star Wars humans
 List of Star Wars species (A–E)
 List of Star Wars species (K–O)
 List of Star Wars species (P–T)
 List of Star Wars species (U–Z)

References
Footnotes

Citations

Sources

External links
 Species in the Official StarWars.com Encyclopedia
 List of species in the Wookieepedia

Star Wars species
Species
-